Ari may refer to:

Ari language (New Guinea), a Papuan language of the Trans–New Guinea family
Aari language, an Omotic language of Ethiopia
Ari language (Ivory Coast), a Kwa language of Ivory Coast